Stotts Run is a  long 2nd order tributary to Buffalo Creek in Brooke County, West Virginia.  This is the only stream of this name in the United States.

Variant names
According to the Geographic Names Information System, it has also been known historically as:
Scott Run
Scotts Run

Course
Stotts Run rises about 1.5 miles north of West Liberty, West Virginia, and then flows east and northeast to join Buffalo Creek about 1 mile west of Bethany.

Watershed
Stotts Run drains  of area, receives about 40.3 in/year of precipitation, has a wetness index of 288.24, and is about 72% forested.

See also
List of rivers of West Virginia

References

Rivers of West Virginia
Rivers of Brooke County, West Virginia